XHMUG-FM is a radio station on 96.9 FM in Mexicali, Baja California, Mexico. The station is owned by Grupo Radiorama and carries its La Poderosa Spanish-language adult hits format.

History
XHMUG received its first concession on March 30, 1994. It was located in Murguia, slated to broadcast on 94.1 MHz and owned by Hector Renato Brassea Eguia. It did not take the station long to move to Mexicali and 96.9 MHz.

In 2016, Grupo Radio México ceased to operate the station, and XHMUG changed to Radiorama and La Poderosa. The next year, one of Radiorama's two Mexicali clusters was transferred to Grupo Larsa Comunicaciones, resulting in Larsa flipping XHMUG to its Toño format. Radiorama took back operation of the station in September 2018, resulting in the return of the La Poderosa name, but the format changed to classic hits in English and Spanish.

The station has been simulcast on XED-AM 1050 since its return to operation on September 29, 2019.

References

Radio stations in Mexicali
Radio stations established in 1994
1994 establishments in Mexico